Andrew Richard Betts (born 11 May 1977) is a retired British professional basketball player. He had a mostly international career.

Career notes
After starting his career as a junior player with the Leicester Riders, Betts played college basketball at C.W. Post Campus of Long Island University from 1994 to 1997 and later at Long Beach State University from 1997 to 1998. He was selected in the 1998 NBA Draft by the Charlotte Hornets in the second round, with the 50th overall draft pick after averaging 18.7 points and 10.1 rebounds as a senior at Long Beach State. He then moved to the Italian league for the 1998–99 season, signed by Fortitudo Bologna.

Honours
Greek cup, Greek league (AEK Athens)
Spanish league (Real Madrid)
Spanish cup (Tau Vitoria)
Fiba Eurocup (Joventut Badalona)
Final four of Euroleague ( Fortiudo Bologna) (Tau Vitoria)
Ukrainian League (Budivelnyk Kyiv)

National teams
Betts has played for both the English national basketball team and the Great Britain national basketball team. He was named England young player of the year, also England player of the year twice.
Betts started his career with the English national team in 1996 aged 19.

Personal

Betts has four children. He is the sporting ambassador for his hometown club the Leicester Riders. He lives in Centennial, Colorado, USA.

References

External links
Euroleague.net Profile
EuroBasket Profile
Aris Profile
AEK Profile
Basketpedya.com Profile

1977 births
Living people
AEK B.C. players
Aris B.C. players
BC Budivelnyk players
British expatriate basketball people in Italy
British expatriate basketball people in Spain
British expatriate basketball people in the United States
British expatriate basketball people in Greece
Centers (basketball)
Charlotte Hornets draft picks
English men's basketball players
English expatriate sportspeople in Spain
English expatriate sportspeople in the United States
Fortitudo Pallacanestro Bologna players
Gipuzkoa Basket players
Joventut Badalona players
Leicester Riders players
Liga ACB players
LIU Post Pioneers men's basketball players
Long Beach State Beach men's basketball players
Pallacanestro Reggiana players
People from Coalville
Sportspeople from Leicestershire
Real Betis Baloncesto players
Real Madrid Baloncesto players
Saski Baskonia players
English expatriate sportspeople in Italy
English expatriate sportspeople in Greece
English expatriate sportspeople in Ukraine
British expatriate basketball people in Ukraine